The University of Misan is an Iraqi university located in Amarah, Maysan, Iraq. It was established in 2007. Originally, the university consisted of the College of Basic Education and the College of Education, which were part of University of Basrah.

Colleges
College of Medicine
College of Dentistry
College of Science
College of Law
College of Administration and Economy
College of Basic Education
College of Education
College of Physical Education

External links
Official Website

Misan
Educational institutions established in 2007
2007 establishments in Iraq